The Clavariadelphaceae are a family of fungi belonging in what is classically known as the Gomphales order, or cladistically as the gomphoid-phalloid clade. First described by British botanist E.J.H. Corner in 1970, the family has 2 genera and 26 species.

References

External links

Gomphales
Basidiomycota families